STID may refer to:

 Service type identifier, a three-digit value in the data payload of an Intelligent Mail barcode
 Star Trek Into Darkness, a 2013 American science fiction action film